Dinos Kalampakos (alternate spelling: Kalabakos) (born November 14, 1964) is a Greek former professional basketball player and current basketball coach for Agrinio of the Greek A2 Basket League. Kalampakos spent the bulk of his club playing career with the Greek team Pagrati.

Early years
Kalampakos was born in Athens, Greece, on 14 November 1964. At a young age, he began playing youth club basketball with the junior teams of Pagrati.

Professional career
Kalampakos first played with the senior men's team of Pagrati in 1979, at the age of 14. He stayed with Pagrati until 1990, and with the club he managed to gain a league promotion up to the top-tier level Greek Basket League. During that season, he was the team's second best scorer, behind Earl Harrison, with a scoring average of 20.4 points per game.

In 1990, Kalampakos transferred to the Greek club Panathinaikos, where he played until 1992. Over the next two seasons, Kalampakos played with the Greek club Sporting. In 1994, he returned to Pagrati, where he stayed until 1996. Kalampakos spent the 1996–97 season with Ampelokipoi, before finishing his club playing career with Pagrati, in the 1997–98 season.

Coaching career
Kalampakos began his coaching career with the Greek club Pagrati, in the 1999–00 season, working as the assistant coach of Giorgos Nikolopoulos. From 2000 to 2006, he worked as the head coach of Platonas Schools, where he trained players like Nikos Gkikas, Ioannis Dimakos, Spyros Motsenigos, and Dimitris Cheilaris. In 2008, he became the head coach of ICBS. He continued in this role after the club merged with Peramatos Ermis. 

During the 2012–13 season, Kalampakos wad the head coach of Polis Kallitheas and Papagou, before returning to Pagrati's head coaching position. He stayed with Pagrati until 2016. In 2016, Kalampakos was hired to be the head coach of Koroivos Amaliadas, of the Greek Basket League. 

After that, he worked as the technical director of Ionikos Nikaias, before he became the head coach of Charilaos Trikoupis.

References

External links
Eurobasket.com Coach Profile

1964 births
Living people
Ampelokipoi B.C. players
Charilaos Trikoupis B.C. coaches
Greek basketball coaches
Greek basketball executives and administrators
Greek men's basketball players
ICBS B.C. coaches
Koroivos B.C. coaches
Pagrati B.C. coaches
Pagrati B.C. players
Panathinaikos B.C. players
Papagou B.C. coaches
Peramatos Ermis B.C. coaches
Sporting basketball players
Basketball players from Athens
Shooting guards